Softball was contested by participating nations at the 1991 Pan American Games in Havana, Cuba.

Medal summary

Medal table

Medalists

Softball at the Pan American Games
Events at the 1991 Pan American Games
1991 in softball
Softball in Cuba